Vöhrenbach is a town in the district of Schwarzwald-Baar, in Baden-Württemberg, Germany. It is situated on the river Breg, 12 km west of Villingen-Schwenningen.

Geography 
The town of Vöhrenbach lies in the Breg valley in the central Black Forest between Furtwangen and Villingen-Schwenningen. The land belonging to the town is heavily forested, comprising 77% of the total area.

Neighboring communities 
The town borders St. Georgen im Schwarzwald to the north; Villingen-Schwenningen, Unterkirnach and Donaueschingen to the east; Bräunlingen and Eisenbach in the south; Titisee-Neustadt to the southwest; and Furtwangen to the west. With the exception of Eisenbach and Titisee-Neustadt (Landkreis Breisgau-Hochschwarzwald), all neighboring communities belong to the district Schwarzwald-Baar-Kreis.

Town structure 

The town of Vöhrenbach consists of Vöhrenbach (which includes the town with its older borders from before 1971) and the three Stadtteile (quarters) of Hammereisenbach-Bregenbach, Langenbach und Urach in addition to 89 further villages, hamlets, farms and homes. In the course of the municipal reforms in Baden-Württemberg, Vöhrenbach grew to include Hammereisenbach-Bregenbach on 1 July 1971 and then Langenbach as well as Urach on 1 December 1971. The districts now belonging to the town Vöhrenbach are territorially identical to the formally independent municipalities of the same name. The town center (Vöhrenbach) and the three districts (Hammereisenbach-Bregenbach, Langenbach and Urach) are local communities in their own right, each having a local chairman.

History 

Vöhrenbach received a town charter in 1244 from the Counts of Urach as competition to Villingen. However, the town never reached the importance of Villingen. In 1806, the city became part of the newly founded Grand Duchy of Baden.

Politics

Local council 
The municipal council of Vöhrenbach has 14 members. The municipal council consists of the elected municipal councilmen and the mayor as chairman. The mayor is entitled to vote in the municipal council. The municipal election of 25 Mai 2014 resulted in 49.1% turnout (2009: 52.4%) with the following results:

Mayors 
According to the legend of the Seven Virgins, it is not possible in Vöhrenbach to re-elect a mayor. Mayors Sorg, Neininger and Wolf were all voted out of office after their first term. In 1981, Karl-Heinz Schneider first succeeded in being re-elected. Karl-Heinz Schneider lost the election for a fourth term in 1997 to Robert Strumberger. Robert Strumberger has now been re-elected twice.

1813–1821: Joseph Merz
....
1918–1931: Karl Kraut
1939–1941: Paul Siedle
1941–1945: Fritz Dold
1945: Karl Faller
1946: Bernhard Wiedemann
1946: Egon Hettich
1946–1957: Ernst Sorg
1957–1964: Friedrich Neininger (1957–1971 Mayor of Langenbach, 1971–1977 local chairman of Langenbach)
1964–1972: Heinrich Wolff
1972–1997: Karl-Heinz Schneider
1997–2021: Robert Strumberger
2021–    : Heiko Wehrle

Coat of arms 

The blazon of the coat of arms reads: "In blue, a golden oblique wave beam, within it a red trout swimming upwards."

Coat of arms of the districts

Partner town 
Vöhrenbach has been twinned with the French commune Morteau in Franche-Comté since 1973.

Culture and sights 

As it is home to a historical clock making region of the Black Forest (see cuckoo clock), Vöhrenbach is on the German Clock Road.

Buildings and monuments 
 The dam Linachtalsperre (de) is a listed structure of historical importance. This dam and hydroelectric power station, which had been shut down for years, was reactivated on 16 March 2007. The renewable energy power plant is expected to generate 1.2 million kilowatt hours. In addition, the Linach Reservoir is to become a tourist attraction in the future.
 The Catholic parish church St. Martin (de), newly constructed in 1953–54 and integrated in the tower build 1871–73, contains sculptures from two members of the Vöhrenbacher sculptor family Winterhalder,  Adam Winterhalder (de) and Johann Michael Winterhalder.
The Catholic parish church Allerheiligen (de) in the district of Urach dates from the 11th to the 18th century and contains works by Matthias Faller (de).
The Uhrmacherhäusle (clockmaker's house) from 1726 war recently renovated.
 The Bruderkirchle or Michaelskapelle: The chapel on the old road from Vöhrenbach to Villingen via Herzogenweiler was first mentioned in 1580.
Ruins of the castles Neu-Fürstenberg (de) and Krumpenschloss (de) are located in the district Hammereisenbach-Bregenbach.

Sport 
The Black Forest Bike Marathon, held annually since 1997 leads through Vöhrenbach.

The soccer team FC Vöhrenbach 1926 plays in the Kreisliga.

Economy and infrastructure 

The town's economy is characterized by medium-sized industry, handicrafts, commerce and tourism. Agriculture plays a major role in the districts and villages. Vöhrenbach is economically strongly connected with neighboring Furtwangen.

Traffic 
The connections to Furtwangen and Villingen are via L 173. L 172 offers a connection to Titisee-Neustadt and via L 180 to Donaueschingen. A 81, east of Villingen-Schwenningen is the closest highway (Autobahn).

Until 1972, Vöhrenbach was also served by the train Bregtalbahn (de), which ran between Donaueschingen and Furtwangen. The western section from Bräunlingen to Furtwangen was turned into a bicycle path after its closure.

Education 
In Vöhrenbach, there was the elementary and secondary school Josef-Hebting-Schule. The schools were though reorganized and this merged with secondary schools in Unterkirnach und Eisenbach (Hochschwarzwald). The Josef-Hebting-Schule is now a primary school and Werkrealschule with branches in Unterkirnach und Eisenbach. The municipal council of Eisenbach decided on 8 May 2014 to cancel this agreement by Summer 2016. All secondary schools are located in Furtwangen. There are also two Roman Catholic Kindergartens. The university of applied science Hochschule Furtwangen University is located in neighboring Furtwangen, providing an offer of higher education.

Persons with a connection to Vöhrenbach

Sons and daughters of Vöhrenbach 
Josef Winterhalder der Ältere (de) (1702–1769), sculptor who worked in Moravia
Johann Michael Winterhalder (de) (1706–1759), sculptor who worked in Moravia and the Black Forest
Josef Winterhalder der Jüngere (de) (1743–1807), painter who worked in Moravia
Joseph Kleiser von Kleisheim (de) (1760–1830), born in Urach, President of the Government of the Principality of Fürstenberg
Michael Welte (de) (1807–1880), flute watchmaker, inventor and founder of the company Welte-Mignon
Joseph Hebting (de) (1822–1888),  wine merchant, landowner and Reichstag delegate (Nationalliberale Partei)
 Franz Sales Hebting (de) (1826–1897), after 1877 Baden state commissioner
Emil Welte (de) (1841–1923), watchmaker, flute watchmaker, inventor and businessman
Berthold Welte (de) (1843–1918), factory owner and businessman, Kommerzienrat (Council of Commerce)
Adolf Heer (de) (1849–1898),  sculptor, named professor at the School of Arts and Crafts in Karlsruhe in 1881
 Konstantin Merz (de) (1856–1915), Reichstag delegate and physician
 Cipri Adolf Bermann (de) (1862–1942), sculptor
 Franz Josef Furtwängler (de) (1894–1965), Politician (SPD), Member of the State Parliament (Hessen)
 Pater Heinrich Bliestle MSF (de) (1897–1987), Council Father at the Second Vatican Council
 Josef Albert Rissler (de) (1908–1982), sculptor and mask carver
 Manfred Mohr (de) (* 31. Oktober 1937), Formula 3 driver until 1972, 1965 winner at AVUS

Further persons with a connection to Vöhrenbach 

 August Ganther (de) (1862–1938), Black Forest poet, lived and died in Vöhrenbach

External links 

Stadt Vöhrenbach
Vöhrenbach: Ortsgeschichte & Bilder
Rathaus und Stadtteil Urach  Website about historical buildings

References

Schwarzwald-Baar-Kreis